SarPir (also Romanized as SarPīr and Sar-ī-Pīr) is a village in Poshtkuh Rural District, in the Central District of Ardal County, Chaharmahal and Bakhtiari Province, Iran. At the 2006 census, its population was 137, in 40 families.

References 

Populated places in Ardal County